Chrysocercops is a genus of moths in the family Gracillariidae.

Etymology
Chrysocercops is derived from the Greek chrysos (gold), cercos (tail) and ops (eye).

Species
Chrysocercops argentata Kumata, 1992
Chrysocercops azmii Kumata, 1992
Chrysocercops castanopsidis Kumata & Kuroko, 1988
Chrysocercops hopeella Kumata, 1992
Chrysocercops leprosulae Kumata, 1992
Chrysocercops lithocarpiella Kumata, 1992
Chrysocercops malayana Kumata, 1992
Chrysocercops melastigmata Kumata, 1992
Chrysocercops neobalanocarpi Kumata, 1992
Chrysocercops pectinata Kumata, 1992
Chrysocercops shoreae Kumata, 1992
Chrysocercops squamosa Kumata, 1992
Chrysocercops thapai Kumata, 1992
Chrysocercops vaticae Kumata, 1992

References

External links
Global Taxonomic Database of Gracillariidae (Lepidoptera)

 
Acrocercopinae
Gracillarioidea genera